Paul Bonner is a fantasy artist who has been producing artwork for major fantasy gaming companies and others for over 20 years.

Education
Paul Bonner spent four years at Harrow on an illustration course.

Career
Paul Bonner illustrated the covers of the World of Lone Wolf series of gamebooks, including Grey Star the Wizard, The Forbidden City, Beyond the Nightmare Gate, and War of the Wizards.

His portfolio includes Games Workshop, FASA Corporation, Riotminds and Rackham. He has also illustrated several book covers, and a pair of posters for long-standing works in the fantasy genre (Tolkien and Lloyd Alexander). In 2008 his first collection of artwork 'Out of the Forests' was published. While not all-inclusive, it contained a sampling of most of his major projects. Bonner's work has also appeared numerous times in the yearly Spectrum art books.

His work for Dungeons & Dragons includes cover art for the adventures Die Vecna Die! and Into the Dragon's Lair.

Bonner's art work is notable for its use of vivid colors, contrast, and somewhat exaggerated features. Practically none of his work contains elves either, though most other 'standard' races are frequent. While typically depicting scenes of violence, few of his works actually show blood. Furthermore, his illustrations of typically savage creatures such as orcs, show a more sympathetic side than norm, including a fair amount of whimsy.

Bonner's work has been featured in each recent Magic: The Gathering expansion, beginning with Eventide.

In 2005, Bonner won a silver-level Spectrum Award in the book category, for Cadwallon Goblin.

A 2007 book published by Titan Books was produced about Bonner and his works, called Out of the Forests: The Art of Paul Bonner.

References

External links 
The Art of Paul Bonner

Fantasy artists
Games Workshop artists
Living people
Place of birth missing (living people)
Role-playing game artists
Speculative fiction artists
Year of birth missing (living people)